Maewa railway station was a tablet station on the North Island Main Trunk in New Zealand. A passing loop remains at the station site.

Near the former station the Steam Traction Society runs a steam fair for traction engines. Another collection of old vehicles is nearby at Austin Mews.

Also nearby is Feilding Cemetery. The first recorded burial there was in November 1886, though the trustees discussed the neglected state of the cemetery in 1882 and the cemetery predated the railway.

History 
Trains started to run on the line when the Feilding – Halcombe Section opened on Monday 22 April 1878. To ease congestion between Palmerston North and Marton, the loop was opened at Maewa in 1914, it being noted on 27 February that a tablet porter was needed. It was not intended for passenger traffic, though described as a flag station in 1921. From 1933 a goods train stopped at Maewa, carrying Feilding passengers visiting the cemetery. The station closed before 1993. Electric lighting was introduced in 1938, the loop was extended in 1939 and work was done to ease the gradient for trains from Halcombe, though it still didn't stop trains stalling on it.

References

External links 

 Videos - 2011 freight train at Crossing, 2014 milk tanker train

Defunct railway stations in New Zealand
Feilding
Rail transport in Manawatū-Whanganui
Railway stations opened in 1914